Kate Louise Coppack (born 30 August 1994) is an English cricketer who currently plays for Middlesex and Sunrisers. An all-rounder, she is a right-handed batter and right-arm medium bowler. She has previously played for Cheshire and Berkshire.

Early life
Coppack was born on 30 August 1994 in Chester, Cheshire.

Domestic career
Coppack made her county debut in 2009, for Cheshire against Essex. In 2010, she was her side's joint-leading wicket-taker in the Twenty20 Cup, with 4 wickets at an average of 20.50. The following season, she took 13 wickets in the 2011 Women's County Championship, including her maiden five-wicket haul, taking 6/28 against Somerset. In 2012, Coppack again had a strong season in the County Championship, with 10 wickets at an average of just 6.50.

In 2015, Coppack made her maiden county half-century, scoring 56 in a six-wicket win over Suffolk. From 2017, Cheshire only competed in the Women's Twenty20 Cup, withdrawing from the Women's County Championship. Coppack remained one of the side's leading players, taking 10 wickets at an average of 8.20 in the 2017 tournament, and hitting her maiden T20 half-century in the 2018 tournament, as well as taking 7 wickets.

In August 2018, Coppack played for Peru in the 2018 South American Women's Cricket Championship as a 'guest player'. She played all six matches for the side, scoring two half-centuries and taking 3/1 from 1 over against Brazil and 4/8 from 3.4 overs against Chile.

In 2019, Coppack moved to Middlesex, but spent the season on loan to Berkshire. She took 7 wickets for the side across the two competitions that season. In 2021, Coppack played for Middlesex in the Twenty20 Cup, taking 1 wicket. In 2022, she was the side's joint-leading wicket-taker in the Twenty20 Cup, with 7 wickets at an average of 9.85.

In 2021, Coppack was selected in the Sunrisers squad for their upcoming season. She made her debut for the side on 5 June, against Northern Diamonds in the Rachael Heyhoe Flint Trophy. She went on to play five matches in the tournament, taking three wickets. She also played three matches in the Charlotte Edwards Cup, taking two wickets at an average of 17.00. In 2022, she played six matches for the side, all in the Rachael Heyhoe Flint Trophy, taking six wickets at an average of 31.50. In a match against Southern Vipers, Coppack bowled a "relentlessly accurate" opening spell to help reduce to opposition to 38/5, ending the match with bowling figures of 4/48.

References

External links

1994 births
Living people
Sportspeople from Chester
Cheshire women cricketers
Berkshire women cricketers
Middlesex women cricketers
Sunrisers women's cricketers